Ab Jadan Qoliabad (also Romanized as Āb Jadān Qolīābād) is a village in Kiyaras Rural District, in the Central District of Gotvand County, Khuzestan Province, Iran. At the 2006 census, its population was 58, in 9 families.

References 

Populated places in Gotvand County